Laura Carina Maravillas Valladolid (born 22 June 1983) is a Mexican football defender who played for the Mexico women's national football team at the 2004 Summer Olympics. At the club level, she played for Palomas.

See also
 Mexico at the 2004 Summer Olympics

References

External links
 
 

1983 births
Living people
Mexican women's footballers
Place of birth missing (living people)
Footballers at the 2004 Summer Olympics
Olympic footballers of Mexico
Women's association football defenders
Mexico women's international footballers
20th-century Mexican women
21st-century Mexican women